Joudrie is a Canadian surname found mostly in Nova Scotia. Other common spellings include Jodry, Joudry and Joudrey. The Joudries originated in Montbéliard, France, and arrived in Canada in the mid-17th century. The name may refer to:

Andrew Joudrey (born 1984), Canadian ice hockey player
Patricia Joudry (1921–2000), Canadian writer
Shalan joudry (born 1979), Canadian writer

See also
Vieilles-Maisons-sur-Joudry, commune in France